Melba Joyce Boyd (born April 2, 1950) is a significant figure in African-American poetry. She has authored 13 books and is a Distinguished University Professor and Chair of the Department of Africana Studies at Wayne State University.

Background
Boyd completed bachelor's and master's degrees in English from Western Michigan University . During the 1970s and early 1980s, she taught English at Cass Technical High School in Detroit and at Wayne County Community College. She earned a Doctor of Arts in English from the University of Michigan in 1979. Boyd was a Fulbright Scholar in Germany from 1983 to 1984. She has held academic appointments at the University of Iowa, Ohio State University, the University of Michigan–Flint and Wayne State University.

Boyd is a former editor at Broadside Press, which was once the best-known American publisher of African-American literature. Some of her work has focused on the life of Dudley Randall, Broadside's founder. She was the recipient of the 2005 Black Caucus of the American Library Association Book Honor for Nonfiction for her book Wrestling with the Muse: Dudley Randall and the Broadside Press. She has written, produced and directed the documentary film The Black Unicorn: Dudley Randall and the Broadside Press.

Eight of her books are collections of poetry and she has won numerous awards for her poetry, one of which was a Michigan Council for the Arts Individual Artist Award. In 1997 Boyd wrote the official poem for the Charles H. Wright Museum of African American History, which is inscribed on the Museum wall. Boyd's poetry is often characterized by sharp, fragmented phrasing. Common themes include urban life and the divides created by class and race.

References

Living people
1950 births
African-American poets
21st-century American poets
University of Michigan College of Literature, Science, and the Arts alumni
Wayne State University alumni
University of Iowa faculty
Ohio State University faculty
University of Michigan–Flint people
Wayne State University faculty
20th-century American women writers
21st-century American women writers
20th-century American poets
American women academics
20th-century African-American women writers
20th-century African-American writers
21st-century African-American women writers
21st-century African-American writers